Rineloricaria aurata is a species of catfish in the family Loricariidae. It is native to South America, where it occurs in the Paraguay River basin in Brazil and Paraguay. The species is believed to be a facultative air-breather.

References 

Fish described in 2003
Freshwater fish of Brazil
Fish of Paraguay
Loricariini